Carol Muske-Dukes (born 1945 in St. Paul, Minnesota) is an American poet, novelist, essayist, critic, and professor, and the former poet laureate of California (2008–2011). Her most recent book of poetry, Sparrow (Random House, 2003), chronicling the love and loss of Muske-Dukes’ late husband, actor David Dukes, was a National Book Award finalist.

Life
Muske-Dukes grew up in Forest Lake, Minnesota. She received B.A. English from Creighton University in 1967, and her M.A. in 1970 from San Francisco State University. She has taught in the graduate writing programs at Columbia University, the Iowa Writers' Workshop, the University of California at Irvine, and the University of Virginia. She is one of the founding members of the USC PhD in Creative Writing & Literature, where she currently teaches.

She has a daughter, Annie Muske-Dukes, who graduated from USC in May 2005, and she is the widow of actor David Dukes, who died in 2000.

In addition to her seven books of poetry, she has published four novels, the most recent of which, Channeling Mark Twain (2007), is about a woman poet who teaches poetry at a women's detention facility, just as the author herself did and the perspectives she gains from the poetry her students write.  Her work has appeared in Antaeus, Ploughshares, Paris Review, and The New Yorker.

Awards
 1979 Alice Fay Di Castagnola Award of the Poetry Society of America
 1981 Guggenheim Fellowship
 1999 Witter Bynner Fellowship
 National Endowment for the Arts Fellowship in Poetry
 Ingram Merrill grant

Published works
Poetry collections

 
 
 
 
 
 
 
 Twin Cities. Penguin Books. May 31, 2011
 Blue Rose. Penguin Books. April 3, 2018

Collaborative works

 

Novels

 
 
 
 

Essay collections

 Women & Poetry: Truth, Autobiography, and the Shape of the Self (University of Michigan Press, 1997)
 

Anthologies

References

Sources
 Library of Congress Online Catalog : Carol Muske-Dukes
 National Book Foundation : 2003 National Book Award Finalist: Poetry : Carol Muske-Dukes

External links
 Author Website
 Poetry Foundation : Carol Muske-Dukes
 Random House : Author Page : Carol Muske-Dukes
 Audio: NPR Fresh Air : Interview: Carol Muske-Dukes, Channeling Mark Twain
 Audio: Bookworm : Michael Silverblatt Interviews Carol-Muske-Dukes About Channeling Mark Twain : Dec. 20, 2007
 Good Golly A Review by Carol Muske-Dukes in The New York Times Sunday Book Review : of The House on the Boulevard St. By David Kirby : April 29, 2007
 

20th-century American novelists
21st-century American novelists
American women novelists
Columbia University faculty
Writers from Saint Paul, Minnesota
1945 births
Living people
Poets from California
Creighton University alumni
San Francisco State University alumni
Poets from Minnesota
National Endowment for the Arts Fellows
Poets Laureate of California
American women poets
American women essayists
20th-century American women writers
21st-century American women writers
20th-century American poets
21st-century American poets
20th-century American essayists
21st-century American essayists
Novelists from Minnesota
University of Southern California faculty